Jean Glavany (born 14 May 1949 in Sceaux, Hauts-de-Seine) is a French politician, member of the Socialist Party (PS) and former Minister.

From 1981 to 1988, he was head of cabinet of President François Mitterrand (PS). He was then Minister of Agriculture (1998–2002) in the Plural Left government of Lionel Jospin. Among other actions, he prohibited the Gaucho pesticide, alleged of being related to observations concerning the sudden decrease in bee population.

Jean Glavany was elected deputy of Hautes-Pyrénées in 2002, and re-elected in 2007. He sits in the Socialiste, radical, citoyen et divers gauche parliamentary group in the National Assembly. Glavany is also president of the Community of Agglomeration of Tarbes.

Political career

Governmental functions

Secretary of State for Technical Education : 1992–1993
 
Minister of Agriculture and Fisheries : 1998–2002

Electoral mandates

Member of the National Assembly of France for Hautes-Pyrénées : 1993–1998 (Became minister in 1998) / And since 2002

Mayor of Maubourguet : 1989–2001

Municipal councillor of Aureilhan, Hautes-Pyrénées : 2001–2008

Municipal councillor of Tarbes : Since 2008

President of the Agglomeration community of the Grand Tarbes : 2001–2008

Vice-president of the General council of Hautes-Pyrénées : 1992–2002

Regional councillor of Midi-Pyrénées : 1992–1993

Sources

1949 births
Living people
People from Sceaux, Hauts-de-Seine
Socialist Party (France) politicians
French Ministers of Agriculture
Deputies of the 12th National Assembly of the French Fifth Republic
Deputies of the 13th National Assembly of the French Fifth Republic
Deputies of the 14th National Assembly of the French Fifth Republic